The Luzon Apartment Building, also known as The Westover,  is an historic structure located in the  West End neighborhood of Washington, D.C.  The building is one of the last surviving structures from the formative period of apartment buildings in the city.   The Romanesque Revival building was designed by Nicholas T. Haller and completed in 1896.  It was listed on the National Register of Historic Places in 1994.

References

Residential buildings completed in 1896
Apartment buildings in Washington, D.C.
Romanesque Revival architecture in Washington, D.C.
Residential buildings on the National Register of Historic Places in Washington, D.C.